Stupid Kids is a play by John C. Russell (1963–1994), first published by Dramatists Play Service, Inc. of New York, and first performed in 1991. Very similar in tone, plot, and characters to the film Rebel Without a Cause, the play follows four students at Joe McCarthy High.

Subsequent to its New York run, it played in Seattle and Boston.

Plot
Jim has a crush on Judy and Judy's boyfriend Buzz is a popular jock. After a police raid on a rave, Jim makes friends with Neechee (a fey kid who has nicknamed himself after Nietzsche) while Judy befriends punkish riot grrrl Kimberly. As Jim and Judy pursue each other through the unpleasant social procedures of high school, abandoning their rebellious nature in favor of comfortable conformity, Neechee and Kimberly fall unhappily in love with them—Neechee with Jim, Kimberly with Judy. Ultimately, their experience alienates them even further from the mainstream, and from the objects of their affection.

Characters
Jim Stark - a masculine, disaffected and apparently rebellious teenager who is new in town and intrigued by Judy
Judy Noonan - a feminine, provocative, and apparently rebellious teenager who is intrigued by Jim
John "Neechee" Crawford - a young gay outcast who is desperately in love with Jim
Jane "Kimberly" Willis - a young gay outcast who is desperately in love with Judy

References

External links
 

1991 plays
American plays